Taekwondo is one of the sports at the quadrennial Mediterranean Games competition. It has been a sport in the program of the Mediterranean Games since 2013.

Editions

All-time medal table 
Updated after the most recent 2022 Mediterranean Games

Best results by event and nation

References 

 Mediterranean Games 2013 Results (PDF file)
 Mediterranean Games 2018 Results (PDF file)
 Official website of the 2022 Mediterranean Games (archived)

 
J
Mediterranean Games